Lawar is a town and a nagar panchayat in Meerut district in the Indian state of Uttar Pradesh.

Demographics
 India census, Lawar had a population of 16,021. Males constitute 53% of the population and females 47%. Lawar has an average literacy rate of 48.5%, lower than the national average of 74.04%: male literacy is 55%, and female literacy is 42%. In Lawar, 19% of the population is under 6 years of age.

References

Cities and towns in Meerut district